Saphenista sphragidias is a species of moth of the  family Tortricidae. It is found in Andes of Bolivia.

References

Moths described in 1932
Saphenista